Montclar may refer to the following places:

 Montclar, Alpes-de-Haute-Provence, a commune in the department of Alpes-de-Haute-Provence, France
 Montclar, Aude, a commune in the department of Aude, France
 Montclar, Aveyron, a commune in the department of Aveyron, France
 Montclar, Berguedà, a municipality in the county of Berguedà, autonomous region of Catalonia, Spain
 Montclar d'Urgell, a settlement in the municipality of Agramunt, county of Urgell, autonomous region of Catalonia, Spain
 Montclar-de-Comminges, a commune in the department of Haute-Garonne, France
 Montclar-Lauragais, a commune in the department of Haute-Garonne, France
 Montclar-sur-Gervanne, a commune in the department of Drôme, France

or to the following people:
 Joseph de Montclar (162590), French cavalry general

See also 
 Montclair (disambiguation)
 Mont Clare (disambiguation)